In computer science, the Edmonds–Karp algorithm is an implementation of the Ford–Fulkerson method for computing the maximum flow in a flow network in  time. The algorithm was first published by Yefim Dinitz (whose name is also transliterated "E. A. Dinic", notably as author of his early papers) in 1970 and independently published by Jack Edmonds and Richard Karp in 1972.

Algorithm
The algorithm is identical to the Ford–Fulkerson algorithm, except that the search order when finding the augmenting path is defined. The path found must be a shortest path that has available capacity. This can be found by a breadth-first search, where we apply a weight of 1 to each edge. Another property of this algorithm is that the length of the shortest augmenting path increases monotonically. There is an accessible proof in Introduction to Algorithms.

Pseudocode
 algorithm EdmondsKarp is
     input:
         graph   (graph[v] should be the list of edges coming out of vertex v in the
                  original graph and their corresponding constructed reverse edges
                  which are used for push-back flow.
                  Each edge should have a capacity, flow, source and sink as parameters,
                  as well as a pointer to the reverse edge.)
         s       (Source vertex)
         t       (Sink vertex)
     output:
         flow    (Value of maximum flow)
     
     flow := 0   (Initialize flow to zero)
     repeat
         (Run a breadth-first search (bfs) to find the shortest s-t path.
          We use 'pred' to store the edge taken to get to each vertex,
          so we can recover the path afterwards)
         q := queue()
         q.push(s)
         pred := array(graph.length)
         while not empty(q)
             cur := q.pop()
             for Edge e in graph[cur] do
                 if pred[e.t] = null and e.t ≠ s and e.cap > e.flow then
                     pred[e.t] := e
                     q.push(e.t)
 
         if not (pred[t] = null) then
             (We found an augmenting path.
              See how much flow we can send) 
             df := ∞
             for (e := pred[t]; e ≠ null; e := pred[e.s]) do
                 df := min(df, e.cap - e.flow)
             (And update edges by that amount)
             for (e := pred[t]; e ≠ null; e := pred[e.s]) do
                 e.flow  := e.flow + df
                 e.rev.flow := e.rev.flow - df
             flow := flow + df
 
     until pred[t] = null  (i.e., until no augmenting path was found)
     return flow

Example
Given a network of seven nodes, source A, sink G, and capacities as shown below:

Notice how the length of the augmenting path found by the algorithm (in red) never decreases. The paths found are the shortest possible. The flow found is equal to the capacity across the minimum cut in the graph separating the source and the sink.

Notes

References
 Algorithms and Complexity (see pages 63–69).  https://web.archive.org/web/20061005083406/http://www.cis.upenn.edu/~wilf/AlgComp3.html

Network flow problem
Graph algorithms